The Warwick Prize for Writing was an international literary prize, worth £25,000, that was given biennially for writing excellence in the English language, in any genre or form, on a theme that changes with every award. It was launched by the University of Warwick in July 2008.  Past nominations included scientific research, novels, poems, e-books and plays. Works were open to be nominated by staff, students and alumni of Warwick University, and since 2014, the publishing industry.

The Prize Management Group 
The Prize Management Group of the Warwick Prize for Writing was made up of senior professors and administrative staff drawn from across the faculties and included the Vice-Chancellor of the University of Warwick. The Prize Management Group was responsible for the administration of the prize, including agreeing the rules, the guidelines for the judges and the arrangements for the award of the prize. The Prize Management Group was also responsible for choosing the judging panel.

2015 
The 2015 judging panel was chaired by A. L. Kennedy, accompanied by author and academic Robert Macfarlane, actress and director Fiona Shaw, physician and writer Gavin Francis, and Lonely Planet founder Tony Wheeler.

The theme for the 2015 prize was 'Instinct'. The winner is in bold.

2013
The judges for the Warwick Prize for Writing 2013 were Ian Sansom of the Department of English and Comparative Literary Studies at the University of Warwick (Chair), Marina Warner CBE and Ed Byrne, Vice-Chancellor and President of Monash University in Melbourne, Australia.

2013 was the first time the prize was won by a poet.

Winner is in bold.

2011
The theme for the 2011 award was "colour".

Michael Rosen chaired the panel of five judges for the 2011 Warwick Prize for Writing, and was joined by the Vice-Chancellor of the University of Warwick, Professor Nigel Thrift, award-winning author Jenny Uglow, Times Literary Editor Erica Wagner and writer, cultural critic, public speaker and broadcaster Baroness Lola Young.

Winner is in bold.

2009
The theme for the inaugural Warwick Prize for Writing was complexity. A longlist of 20 candidate titles was announced in November 2008, followed by the shortlist of six titles announced on 22 January 2009. The winner, Naomi Klein's The Shock Doctrine, was announced on 24 February 2009.

China Miéville, award-winning writer of weird fiction, chaired the panel of five judges. Professor Ian Stewart, Professor of Mathematics at the University of Warwick, provided a vital link between the Prize Management Group and the Judging Panel. The journalist Maya Jaggi, the author and translator Maureen Freely and the literary blogger Stephen Mitchelmore completed the Judging Panel.

Winner is in bold.

See also
University of Warwick
List of British literary awards
List of literary awards

Notes

References
 

English-language literary awards
English literary awards
Awards established in 2009
University of Warwick
2009 establishments in England